The Pantanassa Monastery is a monastery in Mystras, Greece. It was founded by a chief minister of the late Byzantine Despotate of the Morea, John Frankopoulos, and was dedicated in September 1428. It is the only monastery on the site still permanently inhabited. Today it is inhabited by nuns providing hospitality.
Its "beautifully ornate stone-carved façade" is of architectural note.

See also
History of Roman and Byzantine domes

References

Byzantine monasteries in Greece
Mystras
Christian monasteries established in the 15th century
Religious buildings and structures completed in 1428
Buildings and structures in Laconia